Lisa Foad is a Canadian short story writer and journalist. Her debut collection, The Night Is a Mouth, won the 2009 ReLit Award for short fiction, as well as an Honour of Distinction citation from the Writers' Trust of Canada's 2010 Dayne Ogilvie Grant  for an emerging lesbian, gay, bisexual or transgender writer.

Foad is also a regular contributor to Xtra!, the LGBT community newspaper in Toronto.

Books
The Night Is a Mouth (2009)

References

Living people
Canadian women non-fiction writers
Canadian women journalists
Canadian lesbian writers
Journalists from Toronto
Writers from Toronto
Canadian women short story writers
21st-century Canadian short story writers
21st-century Canadian women writers
Year of birth missing (living people)
21st-century Canadian LGBT people